The 2018–19 season was Dunfermline Athletic's third season in the Scottish Championship, having finished 4th in the 2017–18 season.

Season review

January
9 Jan 2019: After three-and-a-half years, Allan Johnston resigned as manager, along with assistant manager Sandy Clark. In a brief statement, club chairman Ross McArthur thanked both coaches for their efforts. First-team coach Stevie Crawford was announced as interim manager for the following league match against Dundee United.
10 Jan 2019:  Crawford was appointed as head coach the following day, with former Pars defender Greg Shields returning from America to take up the position of assistant head coach. The club also announced changes to the management structure, with the appointment of former player Jackie McNamara as a consultant to offer ongoing technical support.

Squad list

Results & fixtures

Pre-season

Scottish Championship

Scottish League Cup

Table

Matches

Scottish Challenge Cup

Scottish Cup

Squad statistics

Captains

Appearances and goals
During the 2018–19 season, Dunfermline used twenty-eight different players in competitive matches. The table below shows the number of appearances and goals scored by each player. Defender and captain Lee Ashcroft made the most appearances, playing forty-four out of a possible 45 games. Myles Hippolyte and Louis Longridge scored the most goals, with six in all competitions. Loanee Bruce Anderson finished as the top-scorer for league matches, with 5 goals.

|-
|colspan="14"|Players away from the club on loan:
|-
|colspan="14"|Players who appeared for Dunfermline Athletic but left during the season:

|}

Clean sheets
{| class="wikitable" style="font-size: 95%; text-align: center;"
|-
!width=15|
!width=15|
!width=15|
!width=150|Name
!width=80|Total
!width=80|Scottish Championship
!width=80|Scottish Cup
!width=80|Scottish League Cup
!width=80|Scottish Challenge Cup
|-
| 16
| GK
| 
| Lee Robinson
| 10
| 7
| 
| 2
| 1
|-
| 40
| GK
| 
| Ryan Scully
| 6
| 6
|
|
|
|-
!colspan="4"| Total !! 16 !! 13 !! 0 !! 2 !! 1

Goalscorers
During the 2018–19 season, sixteen Dunfermline players scored 51 goals in all competitions, with 2 goals having been an own goal.

Disciplinary record

Club statistics

League table

Results by round

Results Summary

Home attendances

{| class="wikitable sortable" style="text-align:center; font-size:90%"
|-
! scope="col" width=100 | Comp
! scope="col" width=120 | Date
! scope="col" width=60  | Score
! scope="col" width=250 class="unsortable" | Opponent
! scope="col" width=150 | Attendance
|-
|League Cup||17 July 2018||bgcolor="#CCFFCC"| 3–0 ||Peterhead||1,848
|-
|League Cup||28 July 2018||bgcolor="#CCFFCC"| 3–1 ||Stirling Albion||2,359
|-
|Championship||11 August 2018||bgcolor="#FFCCCC"| 1–3 ||Ross County||4,949
|-
|League Cup||18 August 2018||bgcolor="#FFCCCC"| 0–1 ||Heart of Midlothian||8,601
|-
|bgcolor="#C0C0C0"|
|bgcolor="#C0C0C0"|
|bgcolor="#C0C0C0"|
| Average league attendance:
| 4,949
|-
|bgcolor="#C0C0C0"|
|bgcolor="#C0C0C0"|
|bgcolor="#C0C0C0"|
| Total league attendance:
| 4,949
|-
|bgcolor="#C0C0C0"|
|bgcolor="#C0C0C0"|
|bgcolor="#C0C0C0"|
| Average total attendance:
| 4,439
|-
|bgcolor="#C0C0C0"|
|bgcolor="#C0C0C0"|
|bgcolor="#C0C0C0"|
| Total attendance:
| 17,757

Awards

Monthly

Scottish Championship Manager of the Month

Club

Transfers

First team

Players in

Players out

Loans in

Loans out

Contract extensions

Notes

References

Dunfermline Athletic F.C. seasons
Dunfermline Athletic